Mushandarreh (also Romanized as Mūshāndarreh) is a village in Mahmudabad Rural District, in the Central District of Shahin Dezh County, West Azerbaijan Province, Iran. At the 2006 census, its population was 29, in 5 families.

References 

Populated places in Shahin Dezh County